Storms was the eighth studio album released by singer-songwriter Nanci Griffith. When recording the album, Griffith chose to go in the direction of mainstream pop music. This was quite a musical change for her, as her previous albums had been folk and country music. Griffith enlisted the talents of noted rock music producer Glyn Johns for the musical style change. The album landed at No. 42 on the Billboard Country Albums chart, and at No. 99 on the Pop Albums chart in 1989. The last track on the album, "Radio Fragile", is about singer-songwriter Phil Ochs.

Critical reception

Writing for AllMusic, critic Lindsay Planer noted that although her change in style was not well received by purists, Griffith "unfurled some of her finest musical stories to date."

Robert Christgau didn't much care for the album. He gave it a C+ and remarked, "I don't know. But I expect she thinks it has something to do with art"

Track listing

Personnel
Nanci Griffith – lead and harmony vocals, acoustic guitar
James Hooker – piano, synthesizer
Fran Breen – drums
Bernie Leadon – acoustic slide guitar, mando-cello, electric guitar, harmony vocals (track 8)
Pat Donaldson – electric bass, mando-cello
Neil MacColl – electric guitar (tracks 1, 6, 10)
Jerry Donahue – electric guitar (track 7)
Mark Donahue – emulator III
Phil Everly – supporting harmony vocals (track 3)
Albert Lee – supporting harmony vocals (tracks 7, 8)

Production

Produced by Glyn Johns
Recording Engineer – Jack Joseph Puig
Recording Second Engineer – Joe Schiff
Mixing Engineer – Glyn Johns
Mising Assistant Engineer – Mike Rose 
Mastered by Doug Sax

Track information and credits adapted from the album's liner notes.

Charts

References 

Nanci Griffith albums
1988 albums
Albums produced by Glyn Johns
MCA Records albums